Nallakunta is a suburb of Hyderabad, India.
Nallakunta Division Corporator:-

Amrutha Y (BJP)

Administration 
Amrutha Y is the (BJP) GHMC Corporator of Nallakunta Division.

Transport
TSRTC connects Nallakunta to the other parts of the city. The closest MMTS Train station is at Vidyanagar near Durgabai Deshmukh Hospital.

Education
Nallakunta is a major educational hub.

Many IIT-JEE Coaching Institutes are located in Nallakunta. Students from across India come to these  institutes to prepare for IIT-JEE.

Culture
The Sringeri Shankar Math is the oldest of the branch maths in Hyderabad. The Pratishtha kumbhabhishekam of the temples was performed by the 35th Jagadguru Shankaracharya Sri Sri Abhinava Vidyatirtha Mahaswamiji on the day of Akshaya Tritiya in 1960. Navaratri is celebrated here with rituals and cultural programs.

References 

Neighbourhoods in Hyderabad, India